Neuhold is a surname. Notable people with the surname include:

 (born 1951), Austrian painter
Christoph Neuhold (born 1994), Austrian handball player
Florian Neuhold (born 1993), Austrian footballer
Günter Neuhold (born 1947), Austrian conductor